2nd Lt. Patrick Charles Bentley Blair (18 July 1891 – ) was a Scottish rugby union player.

Blair was born in Wanlockhead, Dumfriesshire, the son of Rev. Charles Patrick Blair and Jeanie Bogle Smith Blair. He was educated at Fettes College in Edinburgh, where he played rugby and field hockey, and King's College, Cambridge. where he played for the King's College team and Cambridge University RFC.

After earning a first-class degree at Cambridge, Blair joined the Egyptian Civil Service's Finance Department. After World War I began, he returned to Cambridge for military training. He was commissioned into the Rifle Brigade in March 1915. Four months later, he was killed by a shell in Boezinge, Flanders. He is buried in the Talana Farm Cemetery.

References

External links
 "An entire team wiped out by the Great War".  The Scotsman, 6 November 2009

1891 births
1915 deaths
Alumni of King's College, Cambridge
British Army personnel of World War I
British military personnel killed in World War I
People educated at Fettes College
Rifle Brigade officers
Rugby union players from Dumfries and Galloway
Scotland international rugby union players
Scottish rugby union players